Omphalepia sobria is a species of snout moth, and the type species in the genus Omphalepia. It was described by George Hampson in 1906. It is found in Kenya.

References

Moths described in 1906
Epipaschiinae